The 2021–22 Maltese Premier League was the 107th season of the Maltese Premier League, the top-flight league football in Malta. Ħamrun Spartans were the defending champions, having won their eighth title in the previous season.

On 9 April, the previous season was abandoned due to the COVID-19 pandemic in Malta. Following the decision of the Maltese Football Association Executive Committee, the teams that had finished in the relegation places in the previous Premier League season would be relegated to the Challenge League due to having played the prerequisite 75% of matches for the seasons result to stand. However, as the Challenge League teams did not complete 75% of matches, they would not be promoted to the Premier League to replace the exiting teams, meaning that the 2021–22 season will have only 12 teams competing.

The Premier League consists of two rounds. In the First Round, every team plays each opponent twice, once "home" and once "away" (in actuality, the designation of home and away is purely arbitrary as most of the clubs do not have their own grounds), for a total of 22 games. The league then splits into two groups. Teams that finish in positions 1–6 compete in the "Top Six" and teams that finish in positions 7–12 play in the "Play-Out".

Teams 

Twelve teams will compete in the league.

Venues

Personnel and kits 

 Additionally, referee kits are made by Macron, sponsored by TeamSports and FXDD.

Managerial changes

First phase

League table 
<onlyinclude>

Results

Second phase

Top Six

Play-Out

Season statistics

Scoring

Top scorers

Hat-tricks

Clean sheets

Discipline

Player
 Most yellow cards: 11
 Leandro Almeida (Hibernians)

 Most red cards: 2
 Enrico Pepe (Birkirkara)
 Luke Tabone (Gżira United)
 Claude Dielna (Ħamrun Spartans)
 Victor Luiz (Santa Lucia)
 Danny Holla (Sliema Wanderers)

Club
 Most yellow cards: 94
Sliema Wanderers
 Most red cards: 6
Valletta

Awards

Monthly awards

References

External links 
 Official website

Maltese Premier League seasons
Malta
1